Macau people are people who originate from or live in Macau.

Besides their use to refer to Macau residents, these terms may also be used more loosely to refer to those who may not be residents, but have lived in the city for an extensive period of time or have a strong cultural connection with Macau. Macau people do not comprise one particular ethnicity, and people that live in Macau are independent of Chinese citizenship and residency status. The majority of Macau people are of Chinese descent and are ethnic Han Chinese (with most having ancestral roots in the province of Guangdong). Macau people with Portuguese ancestry are known as the Macanese.

Name
The Chinese terms "" and "" refer to the Macau people and the Macanese people, respectively. Attempts by the Portuguese Macau government in the mid-1990s to redefine the Portuguese and English term "Macanese" as Macau Permanent Resident (anyone born in Macau regardless of ethnicity, language, religion or nationality) failed. Consequently, the Portuguese and English term "Macanese" refers neither to the indigenous people of Macau (Tanka people) nor to the demonym of Macau, but to a distinctive minority culture (1.2% of all Macau population).

See also
 Demographics of Macau
 Cantonese people
 Hongkongers
 Hoklo people
 Tanka people

References

 
Macau
Demographics of Macau
Ethnic groups in Macau
Macau society